The 2005 Women's Premier Soccer League season was the 9th season of the WPSL.

FC Indiana finished the season as national champions, beating California Storm on penalty kicks after a 4-4 tie in the WPSL Championship game.

Changes From 2004

Name Changes

New Franchises

Folding

Final standings
Purple indicates division title clinched

West Division

Central Division

East Division

Playoffs

Semi finals
California Storm 3-0 Steel City Sparks
FC Indiana 4-0 New England Mutiny

Third Place Playoff
New England Mutiny 2-1 Steel City Sparks

WPSL Championship Game
FC Indiana 4-4 California Storm (Indiana wins 4-3 on penalties)

References

2005
Wom
1